Ragged Jack is an album by keyboardist Jamie Saft and trumpeter Cuong Vu which was released on the Japanese Avant label in 1997.

Reception

In his review for Allmusic, Nitsuh Abebe notes that "The resulting sessions have a fractured bop feel that might be marginally influenced by the downtown scene, but tend more toward solid, "traditional" free-jazz".

Track listing
All compositions by Cuong Vu except as indicated
 "Garbo" - 5:05  
 "Mr. Mister" (Jamie Saft) - 7:10  
 "Little Vina" - 9:58  
 "The Schmucklehead" - 12:50  
 "Mahunk" (Saft) - 4:38  
 "In Hear" (Andrew D'Angelo) - 6:06  
 "Or Anything Else" (D'Angelo) - 4:18  
 "Karin" (Saft) - 8:56  
 "Jack's in the House" - 3:22

Personnel
Jamie Saft - piano
Cuong Vu - trumpet
Andrew D'Angelo - alto saxophone, bass clarinet 
Jim Black - drums

References

Avant Records albums
Jamie Saft albums
1997 albums